William Hunter, Jr. (1805– July 22, 1886) was a politician and diplomat from Rhode Island. He was a confidential clerk to Secretary of State John Clayton in the United States Department of State from 1849 to 1850, serving with George P. Fisher. He had served as acting Secretary of State on three occasions, once in 1853, again in 1860, and to temporarily substitute for Secretary William H. Seward after his injury in a carriage accident and subsequent wounding in an attack concurrent with the assassination of Abraham Lincoln. He also served as Chief Clerk of the State Department from 1852 to 1855, Assistant Secretary of State in 1855 and Second Assistant Secretary of State from 1866 until his death in 1886.

References

1805 births
1886 deaths
United States Assistant Secretaries of State
Rhode Island politicians
Chief Clerks of the United States Department of State
Acting United States Secretaries of State